Arctomelon benthale is a species of sea snail, a marine gastropod mollusk in the family Volutidae, the volutes.

Description

Distribution

References

 Bail, P.; Poppe, G.T. (2001). A conchological iconography: a taxonomic introduction of the recent Volutidae. ConchBooks, Hackenheim. 30 pp, 5 pl.

External links
 Dall, W. H. (1896). Diagnoses of new species of mollusks from the west coast of America. Proceedings of the United States National Museum. 18 (1034): 7-20

Volutidae
Gastropods described in 1896